James Oswell Hughes Nuttall (11 April 1919 – 7 November 2005) was an Indian boxer. He competed in the men's middleweight event at the 1948 Summer Olympics. At the 1948 Summer Olympics, he lost to Ivano Fontana of Italy.

References

External links
 

1919 births
2005 deaths
Sportspeople from Kolkata
Indian male boxers
Olympic boxers of India
Boxers at the 1948 Summer Olympics
Middleweight boxers
Anglo-Indian people
British people of Anglo-Indian descent
Indian emigrants to England